The Arena Football League Rookie of the Year Award has been given to the Arena Football League's best rookie since 1997.

External links
AFL Rookie of the Year

Arena Football League trophies and awards
Awards established in 1997